Men are Men is a 2020 South Korean television series starring Hwang Jung-eum, Yoon Hyun-min, Seo Ji-hoon, Choi Myung-gil and Jo Woo-ri. The series aired from July 6 to September 1, 2020 on KBS2.

Synopsis 
The leader of a webtoon planning team, Seo Hyun-ju harbors the jaded view that all men are same and has decided to remain single. Hwang Ji-woo is the CEO of the Sunwoo Pharmaceutical Company. He has a cold and distant personality but excellent instinct in business. He takes an interest in Seo Hyun-ju and starts pursuing her. Park Do-gyeom is a popular webtoon writer. He is a well mannered and sociable person. He and Seo Hyun-ju grew up like siblings, but he has held a crush on Seo Hyun-ju for a long time.

Cast

Main
 Hwang Jung-eum as Seo Hyun-ju
 Joo Ye-rim as Seo Hyun-ju (child)
 Lee Chae-yoon as Seo Hyun-ju (teen)
 Yoon Hyun-min as Hwang Ji-woo
 Jung Ji-hoon as Hwang Ji-woo (child)
 Bae In-hyuk as Hwang Ji-Woo (teen)
 Seo Ji-hoon as Park Do-gyeom
 Ha Yi-ahn as Park Do-gyeom (child)
Jo Woo-ri as Han Seo-yoon
 Choi Myung-gil as Kim Seon-hee

Supporting

People around Seo Hyun-ju
 Hwang Young-hee as Jung Young-soon, Hyun-ju's mother and Park's adopted mother
 Seo Hyun-chul as Seo Ho-joon, Hyun-ju's father and Park's adopted father
 Song Sang-eun as Kang Min-jung
 Noh Susanna as Oh Young-eun
 Kim Gyu-sun as Song Jin-ah

People around Hwang Ji-woo
 Lee Hwang-eui as Nam Yoo-cheol, Hwang Ji-woo's secretary
 Kang Ji-eun as Hwang Ji-woo's mother

Sunwoo Webtoon Team
 Han Da-sol as Kim Da-eun
 Jo Hyun-sik as Kang Eun-jae
 Hwang Man-ik as Kim Pal-do
 Baek Joo-hee as Jo Mi-ok
 Yoo Jung-rae as Hong Bo-hee

Mytoon Webtoon (Ep.1-3)
 In Gyo-jin as In Gyo-seok
 Lee Si-eon as Oh Si-eon, webtoon writer
 Lee Mal-nyeon as Writer Lee
 Joo Ho-min as Writer Joo

Others
 Kim Da-ye as Kim Su-jeong
 Lee Jung-yeol as Jung Seok-woo, Hwang Ji-woo's doctor
 Lee Hyun-kyun as Kang Min-jung's husband
 Shim Hye-yeon as Soo-bin Kang Min-jung's daughter
 Song Jin-woo as Kim Eun-beom, Song Jin-ah's ex-husband
 Kim Doh-yon as Oh Ji-hwan, Park Do-gyeom's friend and Song Jin-ah's boyfriend

Special appearances
 Son Sung-chan as Bae Jae-joon (Ep. 1)
 Ahn Se-bin as Oh Young-eun (child) (Ep. 1)
 Kang Dong-ho as Man at wedding (Ep. 1)
 Seo Yoon-hyuk as Seo Hyun-ju's classmate (Ep. 1)
 Yoon Sun-woo as Seo Hyun-ju's ex-boyfriend (Ep. 1, 2)
 Johyun as Yu-na (Ep. 2)
 Lee Jong-hyuk as Seo Hyun-ju's blind date (Ep. 3)
 Kim Jae-hwa as Butler Kim (Ep. 6)
 Lee Seon-hee as Italian Table owner (Ep. 4)
 Shin Se-hwi as You Gyo Girl, webtoon writer (Ep. 8, 10-11)
 Woo Hyun-joo as You Gyo Girl's mother (Ep. 8, 10-11)
 Jwa Chae-won as fellow student (Ep. 11,14)
 Won Jong-rye as Hwang Ji-woo's mother (dream) (Ep. 15)

Ratings 
 In this table,  represent the lowest ratings and  represent the highest ratings.
 N/A denotes that the rating is not known.

Original soundtrack

References

External links 
  
 
 
 

Korean-language television shows
2020 South Korean television series debuts
2020 South Korean television series endings
South Korean romantic comedy television series
Korean Broadcasting System television dramas
Television series by IWill Media
Television productions suspended due to the COVID-19 pandemic